Lonnie Hosey (born December 1, 1946) is an American politician. He is a member of the South Carolina House of Representatives from the 91st District, serving since 1999. He is a member of the Democratic party.

References

External links 

Living people
1946 births
Democratic Party members of the South Carolina House of Representatives
21st-century American politicians